Copper(I) sulfide is a copper sulfide, a chemical compound of copper and sulfur. It has the chemical compound Cu2S. It is found in nature as the mineral chalcocite. It has a narrow range of stoichiometry ranging from Cu1.997S to Cu2.000S.  Samples are typically black.

Preparation and reactions
Cu2S can be prepared by treating copper with sulfur or H2S.  The rate depends on the particle size and temperature.
Cu2S reacts with oxygen to form SO2:
2 Cu2S + 3 O2 → 2 Cu2O + 2 SO2

The production of copper from chalcocite is a typical process in extracting the metal from ores.  Usually, the conversion involves roasting, to give Cu2O and sulfur dioxide:
 
Cuprous oxide readily converts to copper metal upon heating.

Structure

Two forms of Cu2S are known. The so-called low temperature monoclinic form ("low-chalcocite") has a complex structure with 96 copper atoms in the unit cell. The hexagonal form, stable above 104 °C, has 24 crystallographically distinct Cu atoms.  Its structure has been described as approximating to a hexagonal close packed array of sulfur atoms with Cu atoms in planar 3 coordination. This structure was initially assigned an orthorhombic cell due to the twinning of the sample crystal.

As illustrated by the mineral djurleite, a cuprous sulfide is also known. With the approximate formula Cu1.96S, this material is non-stoichiometric (range Cu1.934S-Cu1.965S) and has a monoclinic structure with 248 copper and 128 sulfur atoms in the unit cell. Cu2S and Cu1.96S are similar in appearance and hard to distinguish one from another.

See also
Copper sulfide for an overview of all copper sulfide phases
Copper monosulfide, CuS
Chalcocite
Djurleite

References

Sulfide minerals
Sulfides
Copper(I) compounds
Non-stoichiometric compounds

ja:硫化銅
tr:Bakır(I) sülfür